Veazey may refer to :

Carlton W. Veazey is a minister in the National Baptist Convention (USA).
George Veazey Strong (1880-1946) was a U.S. Army general who served as Chief of Army Intelligence during World War II.
Stephen M. Veazey (1957-) is the current President of the Community of Christ.
Thomas Veazey (1774–1842) was a Maryland politician that served in a variety of roles.
Vance Veazey (born June 25, 1965) is an American professional golfer.